The Flying Frenchman is a bronze sculpture by César Baldaccini, installed outside the Hong Kong Cultural Centre along Tsim Sha Tsui's waterfront, in Kowloon, Hong Kong. The sculpture was gifted to Hong Kong by the Cartier Foundation in 1992. The name "Freedom Fighter" was rejected by Hong Kong's government, causing the artist not to attend the unveiling ceremony in 1993.

References

External links

 

1990s establishments in Hong Kong
1992 works
Bronze sculptures in China
Monuments and memorials in Hong Kong
Outdoor sculptures in Hong Kong
Statues in Hong Kong
Tsim Sha Tsui